Dean Clark (born 31 March 1980) is a retired footballer. He was originally a professional who made a handful of appearances for Brentford and then went on to play for a variety of teams local to north and west London, including making over one hundred appearances for Northwood.

Football career

Brentford
Clark began his career at Brentford at the age of eight. He made his Football League debut against Luton Town in January 1998. He made four appearances overall and was loaned for three months to Uxbridge in December 1999.

Hayes
Whilst at Hayes, Clark scored a penalty kick against Wycombe Wanderers televised on Sky Sports. He scored in the forty third minute giving Hayes a 2–1 lead, however they would go on to lose 4–3. His final game for Hayes was a start in the 2–0 loss at home against Boston United on 28 April 2002, in the Football Conference.

Clark was named in a squad for the England C national football team (formerly known as the England semi-pro national team) match against the Isthmian League representative XI on 21 November 2001.

Northwood
He played for Northwood in three spells, appearing for Windsor & Eton, Maidenhead United and Wealdstone between his appearances for The Woods. In his appearances, he would twice win the Northwood Golden Boot for top goalscorers, in the 2004–05 and 2005–06 seasons and made over one hundred appearances across five seasons, scoring 43 goals in both league and cup appearances before transferring to AFC Hayes in November 2007.

AFC Hayes
Whilst at AFC Hayes, Clark played in the Middlesex Senior Cup final 2–0 victory over Hendon. He was noted as having one particular chance to score when a sliced clearance from Hendon goalkeeper William Viner fell to his feet, however the keeper redeemed himself with a save described as "brilliant". Clark resigned for AFC Hayes briefly in 2010.

Slough Town
Clark made his début for Slough Town in the 2–2 draw against Romulus on 12 December 2009. He was brought on as a substitute having started on the bench. With six minutes to go, he crossed a free-kick into the box for Chris Herron to volley in an equaliser.

Uxbridge
Dean returned for a second stint at Uxbridge, transferring from AFC Hayes on 30 September 2010.

BAA Heathrow (Sunday) FC
Dean enjoyed a very successful Sunday Football career playing for BAA Heathrow (Sunday) FC in the Hayes & District League and the Thames Valley Sunday Football League. He was a part of the club's golden generation that won numerous trophies under the management of Mick Murray. His first season with the club was 2004–05, which saw the team win the treble of the Hayes & District Premier Division Championship, Premier Division Cup and Presidents Cup. The team disbanded the following season only to return for the 2006–07 season, when they won the TVSFL Division title despite joining the league late and overtaking Old Windsor FC. They also made it to three cup finals, winning two of them. His most successful season though was 2007–08, when the team won the Hayes & District Premier Division title, President's Cup and the Middlesex Sunday Intermediate Cup, and Dean finished as top goal scorer.

References

External links

Living people
1980 births
Footballers from Hillingdon
English footballers
Brentford F.C. players
Uxbridge F.C. players
Hayes F.C. players
Woking F.C. players
Northwood F.C. players
Maidenhead United F.C. players
Windsor & Eton F.C. players
Wealdstone F.C. players
A.F.C. Hayes players
Beaconsfield Town F.C. players
Slough Town F.C. players
English Football League players
Isthmian League players
Southern Football League players
Association football forwards
Association football midfielders